Events from the year 1797 in Canada.

Incumbents
Monarch: George III

Federal government
Parliament of Lower Canada: 2nd (starting January 24)
Parliament of Upper Canada: 2nd (starting June 1)

Governors
Governor of the Canadas: Guy Carleton, 1st Baron Dorchester
Governor of New Brunswick: Thomas Carleton
Governor of Nova Scotia: John Wentworth
Commodore-Governor of Newfoundland: John Elliot
Governor of St. John's Island: Edmund Fanning
Governor of Upper Canada: John Graves Simcoe

Events
 David Thompson leaves Hudson's Bay Company to join North West Company.
 January 18 – This notice appears in the Quebec Gazette: "A mail for the upper counties, comprehending Niagara and Detroit, will be closed, at this office, on Monday, 30th instant, at four o'clock in the evening, to be forwarded, from Montreal, by the annual winter express, on Thursday, 2 February next."
 July 21 – American David McLane, being convicted of high treason, is hanged on a gibbet on the glacis of the fortifications at Quebec. (Note: possibly 1796)

Births
April 2 – Joseph-François Deblois, lawyer, judge and political figure (d.1860)
May 2 – Abraham Pineo Gesner, physician and surgeon, geologist, and inventor (d.1864) 
June 29 – Frederic Baraga, Roman Catholic priest, missionary, and bishop (d.1868) 
August 22 – Augustin-Magloire Blanchet, missionary (d.1887)
October 4 – Charles-Séraphin Rodier, mayor of Montreal (d.1876)
December 25 – Bernard Donald Macdonald, Roman Catholic priest, bishop, and school administrator (d.1859)

Deaths
January 9 – Charles Deschamps de Boishébert et de Raffetot, military (b. 1727)
August 3 – Jeffrey Amherst, 1st Baron Amherst, army officer (b. 1717)
October 17 – Jean-François Hubert, bishop of Quebec (b. 1739)

Historical documents
Report of the settlement of Maroons in Nova Scotia, April 21, 1797

Chief Joseph Brant complains that inability to sell or rent out Grand River lands granted his people makes their future insecure

References

 
Canada
97